Boldbaataryn Bütekh-Üils (born February 10, 1990, in Ulaanbaatar) is a Mongolian swimmer, who specialized in breaststroke events. Boldbaatar represented Mongolia at the 2008 Summer Olympics in Beijing, and competed for the men's 100 m breaststroke event. He swam in the second heat of the competition, finishing in sixth place, with a time of 1:10.80. Boldbaatar, however, failed to advance into the semi-finals, as he placed sixtieth in the overall rankings.

References

External links
 
 NBC Olympics Profile

Mongolian male swimmers
Living people
Olympic swimmers of Mongolia
Swimmers at the 2008 Summer Olympics
Male breaststroke swimmers
Sportspeople from Ulaanbaatar
1990 births
Swimmers at the 2006 Asian Games
Asian Games competitors for Mongolia